Eupetochira is a genus of moths of the family Xyloryctidae.

Species
 Eupetochira axysta Meyrick, 1927
 Eupetochira xystopala (Meyrick, 1908)

References

Xyloryctidae
Xyloryctidae genera